"Love Thru the Computer" is a song by American rapper Gucci Mane, featuring vocals from Canadian singer Justin Bieber. It was released as the lead single from the former's thirteenth studio album, Delusions of Grandeur, on May 31, 2019. The song was written by Radric Davis, Justin Bieber, Anthony White, Roger Troutman, Larry Troutman, and Shirley Murdock while production was handled by J. White Did It. However, "Love Thru the Computer" did not chart on any major music charts.

Background
"Love Thru the Computer" is a song in which Gucci Mane and Justin Bieber discuss the feeling of meeting their significant others online rather than in-person.

Interpolation
It interpolates the 1980s hit "Computer Love" by the funk band Zapp with a few lines from the song as the background of the song along with the beat. Mane raps the first and third verses, while Bieber sings the chorus and the second verse.

Personnel
Credits adapted from Tidal.

 Radric Davis – vocals, songwriting
 Justin Bieber – vocals, songwriting
 Anthony White – production, recording, vocal production, programming, songwriting
 Roger Troutman – songwriting
 Larry Troutman – songwriting
 Shirley Murdock – songwriting

Release history

References

External links

2019 songs
2019 singles
Gucci Mane songs
Justin Bieber songs
Songs written by Gucci Mane
Songs written by Justin Bieber
Song recordings produced by J. White Did It
Songs written by J. White Did It
Songs written by Roger Troutman
Songs written by Larry Troutman
Songs written by Shirley Murdock